Rhys Uhlich (born 22 October 1983) is an Australian male model and winner of Channel 7's Make Me a Supermodel. The national television show, hosted by Jennifer Hawkins, launched Uhlich's media career. Uhlich came into modelling as a primary school teacher.

In 2009, Uhlich appeared on Channel 10's Talkin' 'Bout Your Generation and previously had a part-time role as a reporter on the network's morning show The Circle. Ulrich is a reporter on the Seven Network's Coxy's Big Break.

Uhlich will film a role in Blow Back, a feature film about a bank heist. On 24 September 2012, it was announced Uhlich had joined the cast of Neighbours for two months as Scotty Boland.

Personal life

He attended Newhaven College, Phillip Island from 1996 to 2001.

In 2010, Uhlich and his partner Claire Virgona became parents to a daughter called Indah.

Uhlich was apprehended and fined after a drunken escapade in January 2011.

Uhlich is also a noted surfer.

References

External links 
 Official website
Uhlich Label TEVITA

Living people
1983 births
Australian male models
Reality modeling competition winners
Australian people of Croatian descent